Park Bridge Railway Station was a railway station on the Oldham, Ashton-under-Lyne and Guide Bridge Junction Railway (OA&GB) that served the village of Park Bridge, in the Medlock Valley near Ashton-under-Lyne's border with Oldham. It was sometimes known as Parkbridge, and one photograph of the station shows the station name board with the name as one word and immediately adjacent the signal box with it shown as two. The station opened on 26 August 1861 when the line opened.

The station was located on an embankment leading up to the south side of the viaduct over the River Medlock. The main station building was on the eastern, down, side of the running lines leading on to the shorter of two platforms. There was an access road and ramp from the Park Bridge Iron Works access road. 

A waiting shelter was provided on the other, longer, up platform, which appeared to be constructed from baulks of timber, perhaps re-used sleepers. Access to this platform was via steps up the embankment from a footpath that ran along the bottom of the embankment.

There were several goods sidings to the east of the station with no facilities other than a weighing machine. A branch led from the sidings into the Iron Works.

In 1861 the station was served by eight down trains and six up on weekdays, with five services each way on Sundays. By 1895 the station had twenty three OA&GB services each way with an extra one on Saturdays. there were eleven services each way on Sundays.

Goods services at the station stopped sometime between 1912 and 1925, with only private siding traffic being handled afterwards. The private siding closed in February 1964.

The passenger station closed on 4 May 1959 following the withdrawal of passenger services on the line. 

The viaduct was demolished in February and March 1971.

After the lines closure Granada Television's "Inheritance" series filmed a staged crash of 1850 on the embankment.



References

Notes

Citations

Bibliography

Further reading

Disused railway stations in Tameside
Former Oldham, Ashton and Guide Bridge Railway stations
Railway stations in Great Britain opened in 1861
Railway stations in Great Britain closed in 1959